The Ardsley was a short-lived American automobile designed by W. S. Howard and manufactured from 1905 to 1906 in Yonkers, New York, by the Ardsley Motor Car Company.

History

The company salesrooms were located at 50th Street and Broadway in Yonkers.

By 1906, the automobile was advertised in a national automobile trade magazine as "quiet and powerful." It had 35-horsepower, could seat five and was priced at US$3,500.

Advertisements

References 

Brass Era vehicles
Defunct motor vehicle manufacturers of the United States
Motor vehicle manufacturers based in New York (state)